This list of modern universities in Europe since 1945 comprises all universities which have been founded in Europe since the end of World War II.

No universities were established in Switzerland and Malta during this period.

List 

The list is sorted alphabetically.

Albania

Austria

Belarus

Belgium

Bosnia-Herzegovina

Bulgaria

Croatia

Cyprus

Czech Republic

Denmark

Estonia

Finland

France

Georgia

Germany

Greece

Hungary

Iceland

Ireland

Italy

Latvia

Lithuania

Northern Macedonia

Moldavia

Montenegro

Netherlands

Norway

Poland

Portugal

Romania

Russia 

The following list also includes Russian universities in the Asian part of the country.

Serbia

Slovakia

Slovenia

Spain

Sweden

Turkey 

The campuses of the universities of Istanbul may be located on both sides of the Bosporus.

Ukraine

United Kingdom

See also 
 History of European research universities

References

Sources 
 Rüegg, Walter: "Appendix: Universities Founded in Europe Between 1945 and 1995", in: Rüegg, Walter (ed.): A History of the University in Europe. Vol. IV: Universities Since 1945, Cambridge University Press, 2011, pp. 575–594

Further reading 
 Jílek, Jubor (ed.): "Historical Compendium of European Universities/Répertoire Historique des Universités Européennes", Standing Conference of Rectors, Presidents and Vice-Chancellors of the European Universities (CRE), Geneva 1984
 Ridder-Symoens, Hilde de (ed.): A History of the University in Europe. Vol. I: Universities in the Middle Ages, Cambridge University Press, 1992, 
 Ridder-Symoens, Hilde de (ed.): A History of the University in Europe. Vol. II: Universities in Early Modern Europe (1500–1800), Cambridge University Press, 1996, 
 Rüegg, Walter (ed.): A History of the University in Europe. Vol. III: Universities in the Nineteenth and Early Twentieth Centuries (1800–1945), Cambridge University Press, 2004, 

 Post